Aye Ne Win (born on 15 November 1976) is a Burmese businessman and former political inmate who spent 11 years in prison for a high treason with plotting to overthrow the Senior General Than Shwe' regime in 2002 along with his two brothers and father, and was released in 2013. He is the grandson of former dictator Ne Win.

Career
Aye Ne Win founded a gang named Scorpion, which earned notoriety for committing terrors, abuse, and harassment of the public.

In 2002, he and his two brothers Kyaw Ne Win, Zwe Ne Win and father Aye Zaw Win were found guilty of plotting to attempt to stage a coup against the then-military regime led by Senior General Than Shwe. They were sentenced to death and also received a life prison sentence for mutiny. However they had been in prison for 11 years. He was released from prison under a presidential pardon in November 2013.

After his release, he has been a prolific user of social media and has been spotted at many public events, including commemorations for fallen soldiers of the Myanmar Army. He has spoken with numerous local and international media outlets, discussing a range of topics including his political and religious views, the continued role of the military in Myanmar's political life and his business dealings. Aye Ne Win was accused by Burmese activist Maung Zarni of being one of the key financiers of the extremist Buddhist nationalist group known as Ma Ba Tha. He is also known for his outspoken, Islamophobic and Rohingya genocide. He reportedly runs several biased media outlets, and cooperates the military generals. He was involved in personal attacks against Rohingya rights activists through his social media posts.

Personal life
Aye Ne Win is the youngest son of Aye Zaw Win and Sandar Win, a daughter of General Ne Win. He has been in a relationship with model Shwe Eain Si since 2017. They are referred to as 'nationalist power couple' for supporting the anti-Rohingya movement in Myanmar.

In popular culture
Aye Ne Win is the subject of Myat Khine's historic book Ne Win's Resurrected Grandchildren (ဦးနေဝင်း၏ သေရွာပြန်မြေးများ), first published in 2014.

References

External links

Burmese businesspeople
Prisoners and detainees of Myanmar
1976 births
Living people
Family of Ne Win